Juha Helin (born 4 January 1954) is a Finnish former footballer. He competed in the men's tournament at the 1980 Summer Olympics.

References

External links
 

1954 births
Living people
Finnish footballers
Finland international footballers
Olympic footballers of Finland
Footballers at the 1980 Summer Olympics
People from Kemi
Association football defenders
Sportspeople from Lapland (Finland)
Rovaniemen Palloseura players
FC Haka players